Irina-Camelia Begu was the defending champion, but lost in the second round to María Teresa Torró Flor.
Bojana Jovanovski won the title, defeating Olga Govortsova in the final, 4–6, 7–5, 7–6(7–3).

Seeds

Draw

Finals

Top half

Bottom half

Qualifying

Seeds

Qualifiers

Draw

First qualifier

Second qualifier

Third qualifier

Fourth qualifier

Fifth qualifier

Sixth qualifier

References
 Main draw
 Qualifying draw

2013 WTA Tour
Singles